Sacred Name Bibles are Bible translations that consistently use Hebraic forms of the God of Israel's personal name, instead of its English language translation, in both the Old and New Testaments.  Some Bible versions, such as the Jerusalem Bible, employ the name Yahweh, a transliteration of the Hebrew tetragrammaton (YHWH), in the English text of the Old Testament, where traditional English versions have .

Most Sacred Name versions use the name Yahshua, a Semitic form of the name Jesus.

None of the Sacred Name Bibles are published by mainstream publishers. Instead, most are published by the same group that produced the translation. Some are available for download on the Web. Very few of these Bibles have been noted or reviewed by scholars outside the Sacred Name Movement.

Some Sacred Name Bibles, such as the Halleluyah Scriptures, are also considered Messianic Bibles due to their significant Hebrew style. Therefore they are commonly used by Messianic Jews as well.

Historical background
YHWH occurs in the Hebrew Bible, and also within the Greek text in a few manuscripts of the Greek translation found at Qumran among the Dead Sea Scrolls. It does not occur in early manuscripts of the Greek New Testament.
Although the Greek forms Iao and Iave do occur in magical inscriptions in the Hellenistic Jewish texts of Philo, Josephus and the New Testament use the word Kyrios ("Lord") when citing verses where YHWH occurs in the Hebrew.

For centuries, Bible translators around the world did not transliterate or copy the tetragrammaton in their translations. For example, English Bible translators (Christian and Jewish) used  to represent it. Modern authorities on Bible translation have called for translating it with a vernacular word or phrase that would be locally meaningful. The Catholic Church has called for maintaining in the liturgy the tradition of using "the Lord" to represent the tetragrammaton, but does not forbid its use outside the liturgy, as is shown by the existence of Catholic Bibles such as the Jerusalem Bible (1966) and the New Jerusalem Bible (1985), where it appears as "Yahweh", and place names that incorporate the tetragrammaton are not affected.

A few Bible translators, with varying theological motivations, have taken a different approach to translating the tetragrammaton. In the 1800s–1900s at least three English translations contained a variation of YHWH. Two of these translations comprised only a portion of the New Testament. They did not restore YHWH throughout the body of the New Testament.

In the twentieth century,  Rotherham's Emphasized Bible was the first to employ full transliteration of the tetragrammaton where it appears in the Bible (i.e., in the Old Testament). Angelo Traina's translation, The New Testament of our Messiah and Saviour Yahshua in 1950 also used it throughout to translate Κύριος,  and The Holy Name Bible containing the Holy Name Version of the Old and New Testaments in 1963 was the first to systematically use a Hebrew form for sacred names throughout the Old and New Testament, becoming the first complete Sacred Name Bible.

Aramaic primacy

Some translators of Sacred Name Bibles hold to the view that the New Testament, or significant portions of it, were originally written in a Semitic language, Hebrew or Aramaic, from which the Greek text is a translation. This view is colloquially known as "Aramaic primacy", and is also taken by some academics, such as Matthew Black. Therefore, translators of Sacred Name Bibles consider it appropriate to use Semitic names in their translations of the New Testament, which they regard as intended for use by all people, not just Jews.

Although no early manuscripts of the New Testament contain these names, some rabbinical translations of Matthew did use the tetragrammaton in part of the Hebrew New Testament. Sidney Jellicoe in The Septuagint and Modern Study (Oxford, 1968) states that the name YHWH appeared in Greek Old Testament texts written for Jews by Jews, often in the Paleo-Hebrew alphabet to indicate that it was not to be pronounced, or in Aramaic, or using the four Greek letters PIPI (Π Ι Π Ι) that physically imitate the appearance of Hebrew יהוה, YHWH), and that Kyrios was a Christian introduction. Bible scholars and translators such as Eusebius and Jerome (translator of the Latin Vulgate) consulted the Hexapla, but did not attempt to preserve sacred names in Semitic forms. Justin Martyr (second century) argued that YHWH is not a personal name, writing of the "namelessness of God".

George Lamsa, the translator of The Holy Bible from Ancient Eastern Manuscripts: Containing the Old and New Testaments (1957), believed the New Testament was originally written in a Semitic language, not clearly differentiating between Syriac and Aramaic. However, despite his adherence to a Semitic original of the New Testament, Lamsa translated using the English word "Lord" instead of a Hebraic form of the divine name.

Accuracy or popularity
Sacred Name Bibles are not used frequently within Christianity, or Judaism. Only a few translations replace Jesus with Semitic forms such as Yeshua or Yahshua. Most English Bible translations translate the tetragrammaton with  where it occurs in the Old Testament rather than use a transliteration into English. This pattern is followed in languages around the world, as translators have translated sacred names without preserving the Hebraic forms, often preferring local names for the creator or highest deity, conceptualizing accuracy as semantic rather than phonetic.

The limited number and popularity of Sacred Name Bible translations suggests that phonetic accuracy is not considered to be of major importance by Bible translators or the public. The translator Joseph Bryant Rotherham lamented not making his work into a Sacred Name Bible by using the more accurate name Yahweh in his translation (pp. 20 – 26), though he also said, "I trust that in a popular version like the present my choice will be understood even by those who may be slow to pardon it." (p. xxi).

Transliterated Sacred Name Bibles
These Bibles systematically transliterate the tetragrammaton (usually as Yahweh) in both the Old and New Testaments, as well as a Semitic form of the name of Jesus such as Yahshua or Yeshua. They consider the names of both God the Father, and God the Son, to be sacred. 

 The New Testament of our Messiah and Saviour Yahshua (1950)
 Holy Name Bible (1963)
 Restoration of Original Sacred Name Bible (1970)
 The Sacred Scriptures Bethel Edition (1981)
 The Book of Yahweh: The Holy Scriptures (1987)
 Sacred Scriptures, Family of Yah Edition (2000)
 The Holy Bible – Urim-Thummim Version (2001)
 The Word of Yahweh (2003)
 Mickelson Clarified Translation (2008, 2013, 2015, 2019)
 Hebraic Roots Bible (2009, 2012)
 The Restoration Study Bible (2011)
 Names of God Bible (2011, 2014)
 The Interpreted New Testament (2020)

The Original Bible for Modern Readers (2017)

Tetragrammaton Sacred Name Bibles
These Sacred Name Bibles use the tetragrammaton without vowels. They follow this practice in both the Old and New Testaments (though some translations are not complete).

 The Scriptures (ISR) Version (1993, 1998, 2009)
 Hebraic-Roots Version (2001, 2004)
 Restoration Scriptures: True Name Edition (2004)
 Zikarown Say'fer Memorial Scroll (2004)
 Sacred Name King James Bible (2005)
 The Seventh Millennium Version (2007)
 The Aramaic English New Testament (2008)
 HalleluYah Scriptures (2009, 2015)
 Abrahamic Faith Nazarene Hebraic Study Scriptures (2010)
 The Restored Name King James Version (2012?)
 Shem Qadosh Version (2014)
 His Name Tanakh (In Progress)
 Neno La Yahweh Swahili version (2014)
 NJV Bible - New Jerusalem Version (2019)

Limited Sacred Name Bibles
Some translations use a form of "Jehovah" or "Yahweh" only sporadically:

 The Complete Bible: An American Translation by John Merlin Powis Smith (1939), e.g. Exodus 3:15, 6:3, 17:15
 Holman Christian Standard Bible (2004, 2010), the tetragrammaton is transliterated "Yahweh" in 495 places in its 2010 revision [654 times in the 2009 edition].
 The Emphatic Diaglott (1864), a translation of the New Testament by Benjamin Wilson, the name Jehovah appears eighteen times.
 King James Version (1611), renders Jehovah in Exodus 6:3, Psalm 83:18, Isaiah 12:2, Isaiah 26:4, and three times in compound place names at Genesis 22:14, Exodus 17:15 and Judges 6:24.
 Webster's Bible Translation (1833), by Noah Webster, a revision of the King James Bible, contains the form Jehovah in all cases where it appears in the original King James Version, as well as another seven times in Isaiah 51:21, Jeremiah 16:21; 23:6; 32:18; 33:16, Amos 5:8, and Micah 4:13.
 The English Revised Version (1885), renders the tetragrammaton as Jehovah where it appears in the King James Version, and another eight times in Exodus 6:2,6–8, Psalm 68:20, Isaiah 49:14, Jeremiah 16:21, and Habakkuk 3:19.
 Amplified Bible (1954, 1987), generally uses , but translates Exodus 6:3 as: "I appeared to Abraham, to Isaac, and to Jacob as God Almighty [El- Shaddai], but by My name the  [Yahweh—the redemptive name of God] I did not make Myself known to them [in acts and great miracles]."
 New English Bible (NT 1961, OT 1970), published by Oxford University Press uses Jehovah in Exodus 3:15 and 6:3, and in four place names at Genesis 22:14, Exodus 17:15, Judges 6:24 and Ezekiel 48:35.
 New Living Translation (1996, 2004), produced by Tyndale House Publishers as a successor to the Living Bible, generally uses , but uses literal names whenever the text compares it to another divine name, such as its use of Yahweh in Exodus 3:15 and 6:3.
 Bible in Basic English (1949, 1964), uses "Yahweh" eight times, including Exodus 6:2–3.
 The American King James Version (1999) by Michael Engelbrite renders Jehovah in all the places where it appears in the original King James Version.
 The Original Aramaic New Testament in Plain English with Psalms & Proverbs (2010) by David Bauscher, a self-published English translation of the New Testament, from the Aramaic of the Peshitta New Testament with a translation of the ancient Aramaic Peshitta version of Psalms & Proverbs, contains the word "JEHOVAH" over 200 times in the New Testament, where the Peshitta itself does not.
 Divine Name King James Bible (2011) - Uses JEHOVAH 6,973 times throughout the OT, and LORD with Jehovah in parentheses 128 times in the NT.

These versions use either "Yahweh" or "Jehovah" only in the Old Testament:

 Young's Literal Translation (1862) - Uses Jehovah.
 The Darby Bible (1890) - Uses Jehovah. Plus Jehovah appears in many NT footnotes.
 American Standard Version (1901) - Uses Jehovah.
 Rotherham's Emphasized Bible (1902) - Uses Yahweh.
 Jerusalem Bible (1966) - Uses Yahweh.
 Living Bible (1971) - Uses Jehovah 500 times.
 The Bible in Living English (1972) - Uses Jehovah.
 Green's Literal Translation (1985) - Uses Jehovah.
 New Jerusalem Bible (1985) - Uses Yahweh. 
 The Recovery Version (1999) - Uses Jehovah. - Plus Jehovah appears in many NT footnotes. 
 World English Bible (2000) - Uses Yahweh.
 A Voice in the Wilderness (VW Edition) (2003, 2006, 2008) - Uses Jehovah.
 Lexham English Bible (2011) - Uses Yahweh.
 Julia E. Smith Bible (1876) Uses Jehovah
 New Heart English Bible, Jehovah Edition (2011) - uses Jehovah.
 Legacy Standard Bible (2021) - Uses Yahweh.
The Literal Standard Version uses the unpointed tetragrammaton "YHWH" only where it occurs in the Hebrew text.

Non-English
An Indonesian translation produced by the Sacred Name Movement, Kitab Suci, uses Hebraic forms of sacred names in the Old and New Testaments (Soesilo 2001:416), based on Shellabear's translation.
A French translation, by André Chouraqui, uses Hebraic forms in the Old and New Testaments.
The Spanish language Reina-Valera Bible and most of its subsequent revisions uses the Sacred Name in the Old Testament as "Jehová" starting in Genesis 2:4, with the notable exception of the Reina Valera Contemporánea, a 2011 revision which replaces "Jehová" (Spanish for Jehovah) with "El Señor" (Spanish for The Lord).
In the Philippines, the Magandang Balita Biblia–Tagalog Popular Version uses Yahweh.

See also
 Messianic Bible translations
 Tetragrammaton in the New Testament

References

Bibliography
Bainbridge, John T. Translating Κύριος after 600 Years of “the Lord’s” Faithful Service. The Bible Translator 71, no. 3 (2020): 331-356.
Bivin, David. 1991a. "Jehovah"—A Christian Misunderstanding. Jerusalem Perspective Vol. 4.6: 5,6.
Bivin, David. 1991b. The Fallacy of Sacred Name Bibles. Jerusalem Perspective Vol. 4.6: 7,12.
Case, Andrew. 2020. Pronouncing & Translating the Divine Name: History & Practice. Open Access 
Daams, Nico. 2011. Translating YHWH 'Elohim. The Bible Translator 62.4: 226–235.
King, Phil. 2014. Perspectives on translating YHWH in Papua New Guinea. The Bible Translator 65.2:185–204.
Neufeld, Don. 1962. An examination of the claims of the Sacred Name Movement (concluded). The Ministry 35.11: 13–16, 36.
Moomo, David. 2005. Translating יהוה (YHWH) into African languages. Scriptura 88 pp. 151–160.
Pritz, Ray. 1991.  The Divine Name in the Hebrew New Testament. Jerusalem Perspective, Vol. 4:2 10–12.
 
Smith, Mark S. 2010. God in Translation: Deities in Cross-Cultural Discourse in the Biblical World. Grand Rapids: Eerdmans Publishing.
Soesilo, Daud. 2001. Translating the Names of God: recent experience from Indonesia and Malaysia. The Bible Translator 52.4:414–423.
The Sacred Name YHWH: A Scriptural Study, (3rd ed). 2002. Garden Grove, CA: Qadesh La Yahweh Press. Open Access
 The Scriptures 1993, 1998, 2009. Northriding, South Africa: Institute for Scripture Research.
Trimm, James (translator) 2005. The Hebraic-Roots Version Scriptures. Institute for Scripture Research (publisher).
 Unseth, Peter. 2011. Sacred Name Bible translations in English: a fast-growing phenomenon. The Bible Translator 62.3: 185–194.

Bible versions and translations
Bible translations into English
Tetragrammaton
Sacred Name Movement